The Museum of Science & History - Pink Palace in Memphis, Tennessee, serves as the Mid-South's major science and historical museum and features exhibits ranging from archeology to chemistry. Over 240,000 people visit the museum each year.

The museum is part of the Museum of Science & History - Memphis, a collection of historic, educational, and technological attractions maintained by the City of Memphis and Memphis Museums, Inc.  The Lichterman Nature Center, the first accredited nature center in the United States, is part of the museum, as well as the Coon Creek Science Center, an education center which is open to organized groups and features a fossil site.

The Mallory-Neely House and Magevney House are also part of the museum.  The Mallory-Neely House is a three-story Italianate Victorian mansion built in 1852, and features 25 rooms and most of its original furnishings.  The Magevney House, an 1830s cottage furnished as it might have been in 1850, is one of the city's oldest remaining residences.

The AutoZone Dome at the Sharpe Planetarium, housed at the museum, features an 165-seat theater-in-the-round auditorium and offers public shows that project star fields, visual images, and laser lights on a domed ceiling. The Crew Training International 3D Giant Theater opened on January 21, 1995, and features a four-story high movable screen. The Museum of Science & History - Pink Palace, the Sharpe Planetarium, and the Crew Training International 3D Giant Theater are accredited members of the American Alliance of Museums.

Pink Palace Mansion
The headquarters for the museum is covered in pink Georgian marble.  The city of Memphis acquired the mansion when Clarence Saunders, the founder of Piggly Wiggly, became bankrupt. He had been building the residence in 1923, but lost a fortune, and the home, due to financial reversals on Wall Street.

In March 1930, after the Stock Market Crash, the Memphis Museum of Natural History and Industrial Arts opened in the mansion.  The original exhibits featured stuffed animals and birds, dolls, anthropological items from local wealthy collectors, as well as items related to Memphis' history, particularly Confederate military uniforms and memorabilia.

Exhibits
The museum contains a variety of exhibits relating to Memphis history. One exhibit features a replica of the original Piggly Wiggly store, the first self-service grocery store, commemorating the invention of the supermarket by Memphian Clarence Saunders in 1916. Other permanent exhibits include 15th century Native American pottery, pre-Columbian artifacts, Clyde Parke's Miniature Circus, fossils and dinosaurs, and mounted animals.  History exhibits focus on the roles of music and cotton on Memphis, the Civil War, the changing roles of women, and historic Black Memphians.  The museum features several special exhibits each year.

Murals
The original main entrance lobby of the Museum Mansion features a three-panel mural by Memphis artist Burton Callicott. The murals commemorate the discovery of the Mississippi River near the site of Memphis by the Spanish conquistador Hernando de Soto and his men, and their encounters with Native Americans. The three murals were commissioned in 1934 by the Public Works of Art Project of President Franklin D. Roosevelt's government, as part of a series of numerous art and public works projects to employ artists and others during the Great Depression. Callicott, who died in 2004, taught at the Memphis College of Art.

See also
 List of museums in Tennessee

References

External links

Pink Palace Family of Museums

Museums in Memphis, Tennessee
Natural history museums in Tennessee
History museums in Tennessee
Planetaria in the United States
Institutions accredited by the American Alliance of Museums
Public Works of Art Project
Paleontology in Tennessee